Kanaka Ha Ma is a noted Kannada poet and columnist. She has also been active as a theatre actor and a freelance journalist for Kannada publications.

Family 
Kanaka hails from Halikere, Shimoga district in Karnataka. She is married to P. C. Vishnunath and the couple have one child.

Work 
Three collections of her poetry have been published by Akshara Prakashana which is run by Ninasam. She also translated noted Urdu poet, Javed Akhtar's book Tarkash to Kannada. Her poems are featured on Poetry International Rotterdam and have been translated into English and French. Kanaka also used to write columns for Kannada publications including Lankesh Patrike and Kannada daily Udayavani. While working with SPARROW (Sound and Picture Archives for Research on Women) she translated poems and interviews of Urdu, Marathi and Kannada writers and edited books on them.
She is a founder member and Director of PAMPA (People for Performing Arts and More) which has organized the SIWE (South Indian Writers Ensemble) at Chengannur for the last 3 years.
In November 1997, she attended the International Poetry Biennale at Ivry Sur Seine, France along with other well known poets like Kanimozhi and Bei Dao.

Selected publications 
 Holebagilu (The River Gate,1993)
 Papanashini (The Destroyer of Sins, 1997)
 Arabi emba kadalu (The Arabian Sea, 2006)
 Battalike (Tarkash, 2003)

References

1964 births
Living people
20th-century Indian poets
21st-century Indian poets
20th-century Indian journalists
21st-century Indian journalists
Indian columnists
Indian women poets
Indian women columnists
Indian women journalists